Veronica wormskjoldii is a species of flowering plant in the plantain family known by the common name American alpine speedwell. It is native to much of northern and western North America, including the western United States and northern Canada, from where it grows in moist alpine habitat, such as mountain forest understory. It has a wide subarctic distribution from Alaska to Greenland.

Description
It is a rhizomatous perennial herb producing a decumbent to erect, mostly unbranched stem up to 25 to 40 centimeters tall and coated in long hairs. The oppositely arranged leaves are 2 to 4 centimeters long and lack petioles. The inflorescence is a hairy, glandular raceme of flowers at the tip of the stem. Each flower has hairy, lance-shaped sepals and a blue corolla up to a centimeter wide. The fruit is a capsule around half a centimeter long which contains tiny flattened seeds.

References

External links

Photo gallery

wormskjoldii
Flora of Subarctic America
Alpine flora
Flora of California
Flora of the Sierra Nevada (United States)
Flora of the Rocky Mountains
Flora of Greenland
Flora without expected TNC conservation status